Commitment to Europe (CpE) is a Spanish electoral list in the 2019 European Parliament election in Spain made up from regionalist parties. It is the successor of the European Spring in 2014.

Since the 2019 election, two member parties, the Valencian Nationalist Bloc and the Caballas Coalition, have dissolved with the members of the parties joining other regionalist parties.

Composition

Electoral performance

European Parliament

References

Regionalist parties in Spain
Nationalist parties in Spain
2019 establishments in Spain
Political parties established in 2019
Left-wing nationalist parties